Live in Germany is the first live album of rock singer Joe Lynn Turner. It was recorded live at the United Forces Of Rock Festival at the Rock Fabrik in Ludwigsburg, Germany. The main focus of this record is on his Rainbow period, where nine out of thirteen tracks come from. The Japanese version contains a bonus track, Deep Purple classic "Highway Star".

Track listing
 "Death Alley Driver"
 "I Surrender"
 "Power"
 "Street of Dreams"
 "Power of Love"
 "Can't Let You Go"
 "Jealous Lover"
 "Your Love Is Life"
 "Blood Red Sky"
 "Stone Cold"
 "Can't Happen Here"
 "Spotlight Kid"
 "Burn"

Personnel
Joe Lynn Turner - Lead vocals
Karl Cochran - Guitar
Greg Smith - Bass
Mike Sorrentino - Drums
Carmine Giglio - Keyboards

References

2008 live albums
Joe Lynn Turner albums
Frontiers Records live albums